Old Master Q (Wong's romanization: Lo Fu Gee) is a Hong Kong manhua created by Alfonso Wong. The cartoon first appeared in the newspapers and magazines in Hong Kong on 3 February 1962, and later serialised in 1964. The comic is still in publication today, and is the oldest Asian comic series in publication.

The comic is copyrighted by WangZ Inc, a company established by Joseph Wong Chak (Alfonso Wong's eldest son) in Taipei, Taiwan. Joseph Wong still continues to create new volumes.

Name
Alfonso Wong explained that  ("Lo") means "old",  is "a rather ordinary, but respectable title" over two-thousand-year old which denotes a "learned one" "who can become a teacher ('Fu Gee') or, or one who has studied a lot"; the English title "Old Master Q" "sort of" translates the Chinese title, with Q being abbreviated from earlier "Cute". Wong additionally noted the similarity between his main character's English title "Old Master Q" & the name Ah Q of Lu Xun's character, whom Wong considered to be "rather  and satirical".

Characters
The series' cast is led by Old Master Q, an elderly, lanky man dressed in a distinctive traditional Chinese attire. 

Supporting characters include: 
Big Potato Old Master Q's identically-dressed friend with a stumpy, big-headed build. 
Mr. Chin ('ordinary Joe' character, good friend with Old Master Q and Potato. 
Miss Chan, Old Master Q's love interest. 
Mr. Chiu, main antagonist to Old Master Q, often pranking each other).

Format and themes
The overall theme of the comics centres around humour, with characters usually portrayed in a variety of social statuses, professions and time periods, ranging from beggars and office workers to actors and ancient warriors, which allows for a wide variety of scenarios to explore. More outlandish situations incorporate surrealism, close encounters with aliens, ghost sightings, and the afterlife. While each comic is typically produced as short strips of four, six or twelve panels, longer comics have been produced revolving around lengthier adventures of the main cast pitted again gangsters in modern Hong Kong or warriors in a wuxia setting.

While Old Master Q comics primarily focuses on humour, it also reflects changing social trends, particularly from the 1960s to the 1980s. The comics would sometimes feature societal problems in urban life, such as poverty, petty thefts and secret societies. It also poked fun at fashion, contemporary art and rock music. The comic strips sometimes also bemoan the decline of ethical or moral values in modern-day living. Characters often display acts of selfishness or misery, although the comics occasionally display good values like filial piety. The language barrier between the Chinese language and the English language is also depicted in some comic strips, illustrated with Old Master Q's difficulty communicating with foreigners, especially Westerners.

The comics have, on some occasions, expressed complexity in the plots and serious views on major political changes taking place in Hong Kong during the 1960s-1980s. It had previously criticised overly Westernised Chinese, who were often shown in the comic strips kowtowing to Western interests over the local Chinese interests. The run-up to the handover of Hong Kong to China following the Sino-British Joint Declaration of 1984 also became a point of interest, as a few comic strips were published through the late 1980s and early 1990s expressing the characters' fears of handover, frequently represented in a numeral of the year it would take place: 1997. Some of these comic strips also depict direct assault of representations of the Chinese government and the Communist Party of China, occasionally in the form of caricatured depictions of Deng Xiaoping. The handover was later depicted in more a positive light in the years leading to the actual event, possibly representing a changing perspective from the author.

Films
The comic series was made into many Cantonese and Mandarin cartoon animations, one of which combined live actors and advanced CGI graphics.

The list of Old Master Q films is as follows, in chronological order:

 Other actors in OMQ movies include: Hong Wei (紅薇), Connie Chan, Nancy Sit, Chu Yau-ko (朱由高), Fen Ni (芬妮)
 Other lyricists/singers include: Wong Jim, Joseph Koo, Leslie Cheung

Spin-off
A spin-off series called Q Master Q (Q夫子) shows young versions of the characters with similar clothing as their adult counterparts. Each of their names also are related to their counterparts:

Plagiarism dispute 

Some cartoonists and readers claim that the idea of Old Master Q was actually created by Peng Di (朋弟) in the late 1930s and not Alfonso Wong, as some of whom were mostly professional Mainland cartoonists alleged that Peng Di's ideas were stolen by Alfonso Wong. They claimed that the cartoons first appeared in the newspapers and magazines in Beijing (Peking) and Tianjin (Tientsin). The character created by Peng Di was claimed to slightly resemble Old Master Q which is currently being copyrighted by OMQ ZMedia Ltd. The character by Peng Di wore similar clothing and had a little similarity in personality to that of Old Master Q. However, the formats, themes, and contents of the stories were different as Old Master Q was not heavy with dialogue making it easy for foreigners around the world to immerse themselves in the story.

A writer from Tianjin published a book in 2001 containing samples of work by Peng Di, which displayed the similarities between Peng Di and Alfonso Wong's works. The result of this dispute remains unclear as WangZ Inc. has denied all plagiarism accusations.

References

External links
 Official English Old Master Q site
 Official Chinese Old Master Q site

Hong Kong comics titles
Manhua titles
Hong Kong comics
Chinese animation
1962 comics debuts
Comics characters introduced in 1962
Humor comics
Satirical comics
Gag-a-day comics
Pantomime comics
Text comics
Fictional Hong Kong people
Comics set in China
Manhua adapted into films
Comics adapted into animated series
Manhua adapted into television series